Singaraja is a port town in northern Bali, Indonesia, which serves as the seat of Buleleng Regency. The name is Indonesian for "Lion King" (from Tamil singam and raja). It is just east of Lovina, and is also the centre of Buleleng District, which covers an area of 46.94 km² and had a population of 150,210 in 2020, the second largest on the island.

Singaraja was the Dutch colonial capital for Bali and the Lesser Sunda Islands from 1849 until 1960, an administrative center and the port of arrival for most visitors until the development of the Bukit Peninsula area in the south. Singaraja was also an administrative center for the Japanese during their World War II occupation.

Gedong Kirtya, just south of the town center, is the only library of lontar manuscripts (ancient and sacred texts on leaves of the rontal palm) in the world.

Climate
Singaraja has a tropical savanna climate (Aw) with little to no rainfall from June to October and heavy rainfall from December to March. April, May, and November feature moderate rainfall.

Notable people
 I Ketut Gedé, painter
 Jero Wacik, politician
 Pandji Tisna, writer, king Buleleng
 Putu Oka Sukanta, writer

Sister cities

Singaraja has the following sister cities:

References

External links 
 

Populated places in Bali
Regency seats of Bali
Buleleng Regency